Seija Pöntinen (30 March 1934 – 2 June 1998) was a Finnish hurdler. She competed in the women's 80 metres hurdles at the 1952 Summer Olympics.

References

1934 births
1998 deaths
Athletes (track and field) at the 1952 Summer Olympics
Finnish female hurdlers
Finnish female high jumpers
Olympic athletes of Finland
Place of birth missing